Eklavya Sports Stadium is cricket stadium located in Agra, Uttar Pradesh state of India. The stadium is named after very famous student of India at the time of "Mahabharata", Eklavya.

The ground has floodlights so that the stadium can host day-night matches. It is made considering all norms of BCCI so that Ranji Trophy matches can be played. The stadium was established in 2008 when they hosted a match of Vijay Merchant Trophy between Uttar Pradesh Under-16s and Rajasthan Under-16s.

The stadium has hosted a Women's ODI match between Netherlands women's national cricket team and West Indies women's cricket team in Hero Honda Women's World Cup 1997. But the match was abandoned match in which no play was possible.

One Day International Hosted 

The stadium has hosted following ODI matches till date.

References

Defunct cricket grounds in India
Cricket grounds in Uttar Pradesh
Sports venues in Uttar Pradesh
Buildings and structures in Agra
Sports venues completed in 1990
1990 establishments in Uttar Pradesh
Sport in Agra
20th-century architecture in India